UltraEdit is a commercial text editor for Microsoft Windows, Linux and OS X created in 1994 by the founder of IDM Computer Solutions Inc., Ian D. Mead, and owned by Idera, Inc. since August 2021. The editor contains tools for programmers, including macros, configurable syntax highlighting, code folding, file type conversions, project management, regular expressions for search-and-replace, a column-edit mode, remote editing of files via FTP, interfaces for APIs or command lines of choice, and more. Files can be browsed and edited in tabs, and it also supports Unicode and hex editing mode.

Originally called MEDIT, it was designed to run in Windows 3.1. A version called UltraEdit-32 was later created to run in Windows NT and Windows 95. The last 16-bit UltraEdit program was 6.20b.

Beginning with version 11, the Wintertree spell check engine was replaced by GNU Aspell.

In version 13 (2007), JavaScript was added to the existing Macro facility for automation tasks. UltraEdit's JavaScript uses JavaScript 1.7. 

UltraEdit-32 was renamed to UltraEdit in version 14.00. Version 22.2 was the first native 64-bit version of the text editor.

An installation of UltraEdit takes about 100 MB of disk space.

HTML editing features include:
 Integration with CSE HTML Validator for offline HTML, XHTML, and CSS checking.
 HTML toolbar preconfigured for popular functions and HTML tags.
 Customize tags in the HTML toolbar or create new tags and buttons.

UltraEdit is Trialware: It can be evaluated for free for 30 or 15 days, depending on usage. After the expiration of this period, the application will work only with a regular license key.

UltraEdit also includes UltraCompare Professional.

UltraEdit is CA Veracode Verified.

Key features

 Facilitates the opening and editing of large files, up to 4GB and greater in size
 Native 64-bit architecture
 Multi-caret editing and multi-select
 Document map navigation
 Column (block) mode editing
 Regular expression find and replace
 Find/Replace in Files
 Extensible code highlighting, with 'wordfiles' already available for many languages
 Code folding and hierarchical function listing
 Beautify and reformat source code
 XML editing features, such as XML tree view, reformatting, and validation
 Auto-closing XML and HTML tags
 Smart templates for code completion
 Editor themes
 Integrated FTP, SSH, telnet
 Hex editing
 Log file polling
 File/data sorting
 File encryption and decryption
 Project management
 Bookmarking
 Automation via macros and scripts
 Integrated file compare

UltraCompare 
File, Folder, Excel, PDF, Zip, Rar, Jar Compare. 

Features include: Compare, Merge, Sync, UltraEdit integration, Source Control Integration, handles large files

UEStudio 
It is a variant with additional support for IDE editing. It also enhances file handling, file editing, and HTML editing over UltraEdit.

IDE features include: Workspace Manager, project builder (interactive and batch),
resource editor, project converter, class viewer, native compiler support, and debugger with integrated debugging (via WinDBG).

File handling features include: Project Manager, Git/SVN/CVS version control.

File editing features include: Tabbed Output Window for script commands, an intelligent auto-complete tooltip.

HTML editing features include: Integrated PHP, and Ruby support.

UltraFinder 
Finds text in files

Features: Search capability of 2,000,000+ files in minutes, duplicate identification

Searches: Files, PC, Network, Servers

UltraFTP 
UltraFTP a program help the website owner and server administrator to manage the files on the server, and also gave a handy GUI to the user.

FTP client features: Commercially supported, 64-bit FTP client, Native Unicode, fast upload/download, multi connections.

Reception 
In a review published on June 4, 2004 PC Magazine, the author said that UltraEdit v10.0 is the editor's favorite text editor. In a review published on July 9, 2006 Softpedia wrote UltraEdit contains plenty of features useful for all types of users and that it considered the program "excellent".

CNET/Download.com says about UltraEdit: "With its clear layout and powerful project and work-space features, it can handle complex and sophisticated software-development projects. But despite its vast range of features, UltraEdit never feels overwhelming. It's flexible and easy to customize, and the polished user interface provides easy access to the most important options..."

See also 
List of text editors
Comparison of text editors
Comparison of file comparison tools

References

External links 

Windows text editors
MacOS text editors
Linux text editors
Proprietary commercial software for Linux